Ali Baqar Najafi (born 15 September 1963) is a Pakistani jurist and a senior Judge of the Lahore High Court since 16 April 2012 and member of Administration Committee of Lahore High Court.

Early life and education
Najafi was born on 15 September 1963 in Lahore, Punjab, Pakistan. His father Ali Huzoor Najafi was an advocate  Supreme Court of Pakistan. He completed his basic education from Muslim Model High School located in Urdu Bazaar, Lahore. He completed his LLB from University Law College Punjab University, Lahore in 1989.

Career
In 1989, he started his legal career as an advocate under the mentorship of his father in Lahore. He registered as an advocate of High Courts in 1990. He continued on to become the advocate of Supreme Court of Pakistan. 

He was a faculty at Punjab University Law College, Lahore for twelve years. He also taught in private law colleges for eighteen years. He also served as internal and external examiner for University of the Punjab.

LAHORE: A Lahore High Court two-judge bench on Thursday sent a petition of Pakistan Muslim League-Nawaz (PML-N) vice president Maryam Nawaz seeking the return of her passport to the chief justice as one of its members recused himself from the matter.

The petition came for hearing before the bench comprising Justice Ali Baqar Najafi and Justice Muhammad Anwarul Haq Pannun.

References

1963 births
Living people
Judges of the Lahore High Court
Pakistani judges
Punjab University Law College alumni
Academic staff of Punjab University Law College
People from Lahore